Hans-Peter Bartels (born 7 May 1961) is a German politician of the SPD who served as member of the Bundestag for Kiel. From 2015 until 2020, he was the Parliamentary Commissioner for the Armed Forces.

Political career
Bartels has been a member of the German Bundestag since the 1998 federal election. He has since been serving on the Defence Committee. In addition, he was a member of the Committee on Family Affairs, Senior Citizens, Women and Youth between 1998 and 2002.

During his tenure as Member of the German Bundestag, Bartels was a member of the Defence Committee. He currently serves as advisory member of the Commission for Fundamental Values of the Executive Committee of the SPD, a body led by Gesine Schwan.

Political positions

Domestic security
Bartels has in the past opposed proposals to use the armed force in the event of coordinated terror attacks on a German city, arguing that “police tasks are not the military’s responsibility.“

Relations with the African continent
Bartels has in the past voted in favor of German participation in United Nations peacekeeping missions as well as in United Nations-mandated European Union peacekeeping missions on the African continent, such as in Somalia – both Operation Atalanta (2010, 2011, 2013 and 2014) and EUTM Somalia (2015) –, Darfur/Sudan (2009, 2010, 2011, 2012, 2013 and 2014), South Sudan (2011, 2012, 2013 and 2014), Mali – both EUTM Mali (2014 and 2015) and MINUSMA (2013 and 2014) –, and the Central African Republic (2014). In 2013, he abstained from the votes on extending the mandate for participation in EUTM Somalia and EUTM Mali, and he voted against the participation in Operation Atalanta in 2012.

Other activities
 Berliner Republik, Co-Editor
 German Maritime Academy (DMA), Member of the Advisory Board
 German Seaman's Mission (DSM), Member
 Leo Baeck Foundation, Member of the Board of Trustees
 Federal Agency for Civic Education, Member of the Board of Trustees (2002-2005)

References

External links 
  

1961 births
Living people
Politicians from Düsseldorf
University of Kiel alumni
Members of the Bundestag for Schleswig-Holstein
Military Ombudspersons in Germany
Members of the Bundestag 2013–2017
Members of the Bundestag 2009–2013
Members of the Bundestag 2005–2009
Members of the Bundestag 2002–2005
Members of the Bundestag 1998–2002
Members of the Bundestag for the Social Democratic Party of Germany